Blaengwynfi railway station served the village of Blaengwynfi, Neath Port Talbot, Wales, from 1890 to 1968 on the Rhondda and Swansea Bay Railway.

History 
The station was opened on 10 May 1890 by the Rhondda and Swansea Bay Railway. It was known as Blaen Gwynfi and Blaen-Gwynfi in Bradshaw until 1936 and Blaen Gwynfy on the tickets and in the timetable until 1904. It closed to passengers on 26 February 1968 because the Rhondda Tunnel was deemed unsafe. It closed to goods on 14 December 1970.

The nearby Abergwynfi railway station was on the Great Western Railway.

References

External links 

Disused railway stations in Neath Port Talbot
Railway stations in Great Britain opened in 1890
Railway stations in Great Britain closed in 1968
Beeching closures in Wales
1890 establishments in Wales
1970 disestablishments in Wales
Former Great Western Railway stations